Dazzler may refer to:

 Cromemco Dazzler, a graphics card for S-100 bus computers
 The Cruise of the Dazzler, an early novel by Jack London
 Dazzler (Marvel Comics), a fictional superheroine appearing in American comic books
 Dazzler (weapon), a non-lethal weapon which uses intense directed radiation

See also
 Dazzle (disambiguation)